Harriet Rosa (née Albertsen) Spanel (January 15, 1939 – February 2, 2016) was an American politician and community volunteer.

Spanel was born in Audubon, Iowa and grew up on a farm. She graduated from Iowa State University with a bachelor's degree in mathematics in 1961. She worked as a computer programmer for the Atomic Energy Commission at the Ames National Laboratory in Ames, Iowa. In 1964, Spanel, her husband, and their family moved to Bellevue, Washington. In 1968, Spanel, her husband, and their family moved to Bellingham, Washington. Spanel served on the Bellingham Planning Commission and on the Bellingham Parks and Recreation Commission. She was also involved with voter registration and studied at Fairhaven College at Western Washington University. Spanel served in the Washington House of Representatives  from 1987 to 1993 and in the Washington State Senate from 1993 to 2009. She was a Democrat. Spanel died at her home in Bellingham, Washington.

References

1939 births
2016 deaths
People from Audubon, Iowa
People from Bellingham, Washington
Iowa State University alumni
Women state legislators in Washington (state)
Democratic Party members of the Washington House of Representatives
Democratic Party Washington (state) state senators
21st-century American women